Ashburys railway station is in Openshaw, Manchester, England, on the Manchester-Glossop Line at its junction with the Hope Valley line and the freight line to Phillips Park Junction. It has been open since 1855 and is the nearest railway station to the City of Manchester Stadium.

History 

It was built and opened by the Sheffield, Ashton-under-Lyne and Manchester Railway on its line from Manchester Store Street station to Sheffield, in 1855. First appearing in Bradshaw's Guide in July, in November it was referred to as Ashburys for Openshaw, then in August 1856, as Ashburys for Belle Vue.

There is no actual place of this name near this station. It was named after the Ashbury Railway Carriage & Iron Company which built it for £175 in 1855. This company flourished from 1841 until 1902 when it moved to Saltley in Birmingham, merging with the Metropolitan Amalgamated Railway Carriage & Wagon Company. Examples of its rolling stock survive to this day on preserved railways all over the world.
It became part of the Manchester, Sheffield & Lincolnshire Railway during mergers in 1847. That line changed its name to the Great Central Railway in 1897. Joining the London, Midland & Scottish Railway during the Grouping of 1923, the station passed on to the London Midland Region of British Railways on nationalisation in 1948.

East of the station, towards Gorton and Belle Vue, there were two engine sheds. The larger was the GCR's Gorton loco shed (1879-1965) and the smaller, the Midland Railway's Belle Vue loco shed (1870-1956). The Gorton shed had a ferro-concrete coaling tower.

When Sectorisation was introduced in the 1980s, the station was served by Regional Railways under arrangement with the Greater Manchester PTE until the privatisation of British Rail. The main station buildings, subway and a third platform face survived until the end of the 1980s, but all have since been removed.

Electrification and signalling

The line was electrified at 25 kV AC on 10 December 1984, replacing the 1500 V DC electrification inaugurated on 14 June 1954 by British Railways as part of the Manchester-Sheffield-Wath scheme via the Woodhead Tunnel. There was also a signal box here, which controlled the junctions and various sidings. The signal box, opened in 1906 by the Great Central Railway, closed in 2011, when control was transferred to the Manchester East signalling control centre. The new WCML North Rail Operating Centre is located a short distance east of the station, next to the line to Guide Bridge. This opened in 2014 (one of 11 such centres either built or being planned in the UK) and will eventually control signalling across most of the routes across the North West England, including the northern end of the West Coast Main Line and the entire Manchester area network.

Future 

Under the Greater Manchester TIF programme, Ashburys would have received improvements. However, despite TIF not going ahead, it is still to receive safety, security and passenger information improvements, when funding can be obtained.

Other long term proposals include the Manchester - Marple Tram Train scheme, which was on a 'reserve list' of TIF schemes. Significant new infrastructure works would be required between Piccadilly and Ashburys station, known as 'Piccadilly Link'. It would be incorporated within a major mixed-use development by Grangefield Estates, known as 'Chancellor Place', around the former Mayfield Station site.

Facilities 
The station is unstaffed and has no permanent buildings (other than standard waiting shelters) or ticket provision, so all tickets must be bought on the train or prior to travel. Train running information is provided by digital display screens and timetable posters. No step-free access is available, as the station is above street level and the only access offered is via staircase and footbridge. This is the nearest station to Manchester City's stadium City of Manchester Stadium as it is a 15-20 minute walk.

Services 
Other services frequently pass through the station without stopping. The station is operated by Northern Trains.

Notes

References 

Radford, B., (1988) Midland Though The Peak Unicorn Books
 
 
 Station on navigable O. S. map

External links 

 1936 aerial view of station and street entrance

Railway stations in Manchester
DfT Category F2 stations
Former Great Central Railway stations
Northern franchise railway stations
Railway stations in Great Britain opened in 1855